Exhibition of Achievements of National Economy (Vystavka dostizheniy narodnogo khozyaystva, abbreviated as VDNKh or VDNH) is a permanent general purpose trade show and amusement park in Moscow, Russia.  Between 1991 and 2014, it was also called the All-Russia Exhibition Centre. It is a state joint-stock company.

Location and transportation
VDNKh is located in Ostankinsky District of Moscow, less than a kilometer from Ostankino Tower. It is served by VDNKh subway station, as well as by Moscow Monorail. Cosmonauts Alley and the Worker and Kolkhoz Woman statue are situated just outside the main entrance to VDNKh. It also borders Moscow Botanical Garden and a smaller , and in recent years the three parks served as a united park complex.

History

1935–1939 construction
The exhibition was established February 17, 1935 as the All-Union Agricultural Exhibition (VSKhV) (Vsesoyuznaya selsko-khozyaystvennaya vystavka). An existing site (then known as Ostankino Park, a country territory recently incorporated into the city limits), was approved in August 1935. The master plan by Vyacheslav Oltarzhevsky was approved in April 1936, and the first show season was announced to begin in July 1937 and was designed as a "City of Exhibitions" with streets and public spaces, which was very common in the 1930s of the 20th century.
However, plans did not materialise, and three weeks before the deadline Joseph Stalin personally postponed the exhibition by one year (to August 1938). It seemed that this time everything would be ready on time, but again the builders failed to complete their work, and regional authorities failed to select and deliver proper exhibits. Some pavilions and the 1937 entrance gates by Oltarzhevsky were torn down to be replaced with more appropriate structures (most pavilions were criticised for having no windows).  According to Oltarzhevsky's original plan, all of the pavilions were to be constructed from wood.  In 1938, a government commission examined the construction and decided that it did not suit the ideological direction of the moment. The exhibition was considered too modest and too temporary. Oltarzhevsky was arrested, together with the Commissar for Agriculture and his staff, and eventually released in 1943. Later, he worked on the 1947-1953 Moscow skyscraper project.

As a result, in August 1938 Nikita Khrushchev, addressing the assembled Supreme Soviet of the Soviet Union, declared that the site was not ready, and the opening was postponed until August 1939. It finally opened on 1 August 1939, and was open to the public between 08:00 and 23:00 until 25 October with a daily attendance of 40,000. The 1940 and 1941 seasons followed but following German invasion in 1941 the exhibition was closed until the end of World War II.

1939 pavilions, as presented in 1950 album and today:

1948–1959 renovation

In October 1948 the State ordered the renewal of the Exhibition, starting with the 1950 season. Again, the opening was postponed more than once; the first post-war season opened in 1954 (still as Agricultural exhibition). In the 1956 season the planners set aside an Industrial area within the main territory; more restructuring and rebuilding followed. In 1959 the park was renamed Exhibition of Achievements of the National Economy (Vystavka dostizheniy narodnovo khozyaystva) or  ВДНХ/VDNKh.

By 1989 the exhibition had 82 pavilions with an exhibition area of 700,000 square metres. Each pavilion (including the 1939 "regions") had been dedicated to a particular industry or field: the Engineering Pavilion (1954), the Space Pavilion (1966), the Central Industrial Zones Pavilion (1955), the Atomic Energy Pavilion (1954), the People's Education Pavilion (1954), the Radioelectronics Pavilion (1958), the Soviet Culture Pavilion (1964).

During Soviet times, each year VDNKh hosted more than 300 national and international exhibitions and many conferences, seminars and meetings of scientists and industry professionals. These events attracted about 11 million visitors annually, including 600,000 guests from outside the Soviet Union. The "Radioelectronics" exhibition hall for some years housed the working (and unique) prototypes of the most advanced ES EVM computers to date, which were time-shared by many research organisations right on the premises.

The most memorable feature of the exhibition site was the Worker and Kolkhoz Woman (Rabochiy i kolkhoznitsa) statue, featuring the gigantic figures of a man and woman holding together the famous "hammer and sickle". The sculpture, which reaches 25 meters toward the sky, was designed by Vera Mukhina and originally crowned the 35-meter-tall Soviet pavilion at the Paris Exposition Internationale des Arts et Techniques dans la Vie Moderne (1937). The statue featured on a logo of Mosfilm, Russia's largest movie studio.

Present day

In 1992, VDNKh was renamed, receiving the new acronym VVC, which remained in use until 2014. It occupies 2,375,000 square metres of which 266,000 square metres are used for indoor exhibits. The territory of VDNKh is greater than that of the Principality of Monaco and has approximately 400 buildings.  Inadequate maintenance of Vera Mukhina's statue caused such disrepair that the statue was disassembled. It was slated to be refurbished and installed on the top of the new pavilion by 2008, but funding shortages lead to dragged-out restoration. It was finally reerected in December 2009, now standing atop of a large constructivist pavilion, apparently recreating the original exhibition pavilion from the 1937 World's Fair in Paris that it was designed for.

The "VDNKh" (or VVTs) complex still operates including the name of a nearby subway station and some sights:
 pavilions 
 fountains 
 a luna-park 
 Cosmonautics museum 
 a rocket and even a Buran spaceсraft
 The centre of oceanography and marine biology “Moskvarium” (or Moscow Oceanarium):  80 aquariums, 8000 species of sea creatures from all over the world including 500 species of fish, killer whales, three metre sharks, dolphins and Russian sturgeon.

It's the biggest skating rink in Russia and Europe.

Restoration

On 14 May 2014 the previous name VDNKh was restored, following an interactive poll.  In addition, the mayor of Moscow announced that the Russian space shuttle, the structural test article - TVA, which was an attraction and restaurant at Gorky Park in Moscow was to be moved to the VNDKh, to be displayed near the Vostok rocket in front of the Cosmos hall. It was moved 5–6 July 2014 and re-assembled by 21 July.

In addition there is a Su-27 fighter jet on display.

Currently, the larger international exhibitions are mostly held at the new facilities of Moscow Expocentre.

In September 2018, Sergey Shogurov was appointed as CEO of VDNK. Under the leadership of Shogurov, new museum and exhibition spaces were opened, a Landscape Park was created, and objects of cultural heritage were carried out, public electric transport was launched. In 2019, the restoration of the "Fraternity of peoples" and "Stone Flower" fountains was completed.

The site 

The exhibition centre was built in the era of Joseph Stalin. The place selected was Moscow's northern suburb Ostankino. The main planner was Vyacheslav Oltarzhevsky who planned a central avenue with fountains, small roads and a large square facing the central pavilion at the end of the avenue. A statue of Vladimir Lenin used to stand in the front of the pavilion. In the central square there is a big fountain called, Fontan Druzhba Narodov. In English it means, Friendship of People Fountain. Designed in the shape of an octagon, the fountain was created to glorify the people of the Soviet Union. There is another fountain called "The Stone Flower Fountain" facing the Ukraine Pavilion. There is a smaller square facing the Space Pavilion in the centre of which stood a Tupolev Tu-154 aircraft, placed there in 1976 after the pavilion of Agricultural Machinery became the Cosmos Pavilion. This aircraft was later scrapped in 2008. A large statue of Joseph Stalin stood in the square until 1948. This had previously stood on the banks of the Moskva River in the city centre. The square is called The Industrial Square.

The northern area of the site is an area shared between the exhibition centre and the botanic gardens of the nearby Russian Academy of Sciences. In it are agricultural pavilions and estate pools with vegetation including: Michurin's Garden and the Golden Spike Fountain. All the fountains in the centre are covered with gold. There are also many statues situated throughout the site, particularly of Soviet leaders. In addition, the site houses cinemas, cafés, theatre pavilions as well as a church built after the fall of the Soviet Union.

In the southern area of the complex, near the central entrance there is an Amusement Park with the Moscow-850 Ferris wheel. It was built in 2004 as part of Moscow's 850th anniversary celebration. The restored Soviet pavilion from Expo 67 in Montreal is now  the Moscow Pavilion. Soviet architects' planned the pavilions and Soviet artists' designed the fountains. Designed in Stalinist architecture, some pavilions were built in the wedding cake style; such as the Central Pavilion that was famous in the Communist States at that time.

In 2008, the Big Constructivist Pavilion was built as a replica of the original Soviet pavilion. In 2009, the renovated statue of Worker and Kolkhoz woman was erected on top of the building.

The Worker and Kolkhoz woman sculpture was originally created to crown the Soviet pavilion of the World's Fair. The organizers had placed the Soviet and Nazi pavilions facing each other across the main pedestrian boulevard at the Trocadéro on the north bank of the Seine.

Today visitors can rent a car or a bicycle to tour the site.

See also 
 Sokolniki Exhibition and Convention Centre

References

External links

Official website
Map of the VDNH  in infoservices website
 General information in russianmuseums website
Virtual tours and panoramas of the VDNH 
VDNH in WikiMapia website
A comprehensive architectural history of the Exhibition in Russian

 
Tourist attractions in Moscow
Buildings and structures built in the Soviet Union
Buildings and structures in Moscow
Soviet art
Economy of the Soviet Union
Trade fairs in Russia
Convention centers in Russia
Buildings and structures completed in 1939
Stalinist architecture
Soviet phraseology
Trade fair venues
Cultural heritage monuments of federal significance in Moscow